Gorno Sedlarce is a village in the municipality of Bogovinje, North Macedonia.

Demographics
Gorno Sedlarce appears in 15th century Ottoman defters as a village in the nahiyah of Kalkandelen. Among its inhabitants, a certain Nikolla son of Arbanas is recorded as a household head.The name Arbanas, is a medieval rendering for Albanian, indicating an Albanian presence in the village.

As of the 2021 census, Gorno Sedlarce had 1,521 residents with the following ethnic composition:
Albanians 1,482
Persons for whom data are taken from administrative sources 36
Macedonians 2
Others 1

According to the 2002 census, the village had a total of 1,776 inhabitants. Ethnic groups in the village include:
Albanians 1,773
Others 3

References

External links

Villages in Bogovinje Municipality
Albanian communities in North Macedonia